Trip to Prillarguri is a live album by George Russell originally recorded in 1970 and subsequently released on the Italian Soul Note label in 1982, featuring a performance by Russell with Stanton Davis, Jan Garbarek, Terje Rypdal, Arild Andersen, and Jon Christensen. The Allmusic review awarded the album 3 stars, although, as no review text appears to date, this can be considered the default rating for those albums awaiting a review.

Track listing
All compositions by George Russell except as indicated
 "Theme (Jan Garbarek) – 7:11  
 "Souls" – 8:41  
 "Event III" – 3:03  
 "Vips" (Garbarek) – 4:22  
 "Stratusphunk" – 8:40  
 "Esoteric Circle" (Garbarek) – 4:56  
 "Man On The Moon" (Ornette Coleman) – 11:00  
Recorded live at Estrad, Sodertalje, Sweden, March 1970.

Personnel
George Russell – piano 
Jan Garbarek – tenor saxophone
Stanton Davis – trumpet
Terje Rypdal – electric guitar  
Arild Andersen – bass  
Jon Christensen – drums

References

Jan Garbarek live albums
George Russell (composer) live albums
1982 live albums
Black Saint/Soul Note live albums